Hopeton is an unincorporated community in Woods County, Oklahoma, United States. Hopeton has a post office, with ZIP code 73746.

Demographics

Economy 
Hopeton State Bank is an independently-owned bank located in Hopeton, chartered in 1919. The Farmers Cooperative Association of Alva operates a seasonal grain elevator in Hopeton. Hopeton Church maintains its Main Campus in Hopeton.

References

Unincorporated communities in Woods County, Oklahoma
Unincorporated communities in Oklahoma